

Great Britain
Bombay and Madras – Warren Hastings retires as governor general
Jamaica – Alured Clarke, Governor (1784–1790)

Portugal
 Angola – José de Almeida e Vasconcellos de Soveral e Carvalho, Governor of Angola (1784–1790)
 Macau – Bernardo Aleixo de Lemos e Faria, Governor of Macau (1783–1788)

Colonial governors
Colonial governors
1785